James Edgar Lennox  (November 3, 1883 – October 26, 1939) was an American professional baseball third baseman. He played in Major League Baseball (MLB) for the Philadelphia Athletics, Brooklyn Superbas, Chicago Cubs, and Pittsburgh Rebels.

While playing for the Rebels in 1914, Lennox hit for the cycle on May 6, becoming the only Federal League player to do so.  He also hit pinch-hit home runs in consecutive games on June 10 and 11, a feat that was not accomplished again until Victor Martinez of the Detroit Tigers did so against the Miami Marlins on April 4 and 5, 2016.

See also
 List of Major League Baseball players to hit for the cycle

External links
, or Retrosheet

1883 births
1939 deaths
Major League Baseball third basemen
Brooklyn Superbas players
Philadelphia Athletics players
Pittsburgh Rebels players
Chicago Cubs players
Baseball players from Camden, New Jersey
Meriden Silverites players
New Haven Blues players
Lancaster Red Roses players
Rochester Bronchos players
Louisville Colonels (minor league) players
Kansas City Blues (baseball) players
Montreal Royals players
Atlanta Crackers players